Jürgen Kramny (born 18 October 1971) is a German football coach and a former player who last managed Arminia Bielefeld. He spent five seasons in the Bundesliga as a player with VfB Stuttgart, 1. FC Nürnberg and Mainz 05.

Career

Early career
In July 2010, Kramny became manager of the under-19 team of VfB Stuttgart. From 13 October 2010 to 12 December 2010 he worked with the new head coach of the first team Jens Keller as assistant coach. After the sacking of Keller, Kramny returned as head coach to the under-19 team of VfB Stuttgart.

VfB Stuttgart II
On 17 May 2011, Kramny was appointed as head coach of VfB Stuttgart II In his first season, the team finished in 11th place. The following season, the reserve team finished in 14th place. In the 2013–14 season, the team finished in 15th place. In the 2014–15 season, Stuttgart II finished in 13th place. He finished with a record of 52 wins, 46 draws, and 71 losses. During the 2015–16 season, Kramny was appointed as the interim head coach of the first team on 24 November 2015. His final match was a 3–1 loss to Holstein Kiel on 20 November 2015. Stuttgart II was in 18th place and fighting relegation when he took over the first team.

VfB Stuttgart
Kramny was appointed as the interim head coach on 24 November 2015. His first match in–charge finished in a 4–1 loss to Borussia Dortmund. On 20 December 2015, Kramny was named as permanent head coach of VfB Stuttgart. The permanent job came the day after a 3–1 win against VfL Wolfsburg. Stuttgart were relegated after losing 3–1 to Wolfsburg on 14 May 2016. Kramny was dismissed from the first team on 15 May 2016. He finished with a record of seven wins, five draws, and 11 losses. In June 2016 VfB Stuttgart announced that Kramny also does not return to the second team and won't work for VfB Stuttgart anymore.

Arminia Bielefeld
He was named the head coach of Arminia Bielefeld on 15 November 2016. On 14 March 2017, he was sacked.

Coaching record

Honours
Bundesliga: 1991–92

References

External links

1971 births
Living people
People from Ludwigsburg
Sportspeople from Stuttgart (region)
German footballers
Germany under-21 international footballers
Association football midfielders
Bundesliga players
2. Bundesliga players
SpVgg Ludwigsburg players
VfB Stuttgart players
VfB Stuttgart II players
1. FC Nürnberg players
1. FC Saarbrücken players
1. FSV Mainz 05 players
SV Darmstadt 98 players
1. FSV Mainz 05 II players
German football managers
Bundesliga managers
2. Bundesliga managers
3. Liga managers
VfB Stuttgart managers
Arminia Bielefeld managers
VfB Stuttgart II managers
Footballers from Baden-Württemberg